Xiling is a district of Yichang, Hubei, People's Republic of China. It includes the central part of Yichang's urban area, on the left (northwestern) bank of the Yangtze River.

History
In September 1949, the main part of the territory of modern-day Xiling was included in City Government Districts Two and Three. Kangzhuang Road, Fusui Road and Huaiyuan Road were part of District One. In August 1950, these districts were eliminated and the city was governed by the police offices and resident committees.

In August 1952, the territory of modern-day Xiling District was divided amongst Yichang City People's Government's Second, Third, Fourth and Fifth Subdistrict Government Committees. In March 1953, these committees were renamed as City Government Organ Subdistrict Offices. In April 1956, these areas were named Binjianglu ("Riverfront Road") Subdistrict Office, Jiefanglu ("Liberation Road") Subdistrict Office, Xueyuanjie ("School Street") Subdistrict Office, and Guloujie ("Drum Tower Street") Subdistrict Office respectively.

In May 1960, the Yichang government decided to make the five then-existing subdistricts into three people's communes. Binjianglu Subdistrict Office, Jiefanglu Subdistrict Office and Xueyuanjie Subdistrict Office were united into Jiefang ("Liberation") People's Commune. Guloujie Subdistrict Office became Xiling People's Commune. Jiefang People's Commune consisted of five subcommunes: Hepingli, Jiefanglu ("Liberation Road"), Xueyuanjie ("School Street"), Shiweijiguan, and Yunjilu. Xiling People's Commune consisted of four subcommunes: Minzhu ("Democracy"), Xiling, Sanxia ("Three Gorges") and Xiba.

In 1967, Xiling People's Commune was renamed as Yichang City Dongfanghong ("The East is Red") People's Commune.

In May 1968, the Yichang Area Revolutionary Committee approved the creation of Yichang City Jiefang Commune Committee and Yichang City Dongfanghong Commune Committee.

In August 1980, the Yichang City Revolutionary Committee made Yichang City Dongfanghong People's Commune into Xiling Subdistrict and Yichang City Jiefang Renmin People's Commune into Yunji Subdistrict. Gezhouba Subdistrict and Yemingzhu Subdistrict came under the joint administration of Yichang and the Gezhouba Engineering Office.

In an act of the State Council of the People's Republic of China and the government of Hubei province taken on December 13, 1986 and carried out in the following year, Xiling District, Wujiagang District and Dianjun District were officially established as districts.

On April 3, 1987, Xiling District Preliminary Group ( was created. On June 2, 1987, the district's National People's Congress, Government, and Chinese People's Political Consultative Conference Preparation Groups were created. On June 3, 1987, the Yichang City Xiling District Community Party Committee ( was created. On November 18, 1987, Xiling District held its first National People's Congress meeting and selected the first government for Xiling District.

As of 1996, Xiling District had an area of 89.8 km2, a population of 344,000 and was made up of seven subdistricts, one township and one economic development zone including the now-disbanded Gulou Subdistrict.

As of the Fifth National Population Census of the People's Republic of China in 2000, Xiling District had a population of 427,299 and was made up of seven subdistricts, one township, one economic development zone and one scenic area.

As of the end of 2004, Xiling District was made up of six subdistricts (not including Gulou Subdistrict) and one township which were further divided into eighty-two residential communities and eleven villages.

As of the Sixth National Population Census of the People's Republic of China in 2010, Xiling District had a population of 512,074 and was made up of six subdistricts, one township, one economic development zone and one scenic area.

Administrative divisions
The district administers 9 subdistricts and 1 township:

Subdistricts:
Xiling Subdistrict, Xueyuan Subdistrict, Yunji Subdistrict, Xiba Subdistrict, Gezhouba Subdistrict, Yemingzhu Subdistrict, Dongyuan Subdistrict, Nanyuan Subdistrict, Beiyuan Subdistrict

The only township is Yaowan Township

Other area:
Xiakou Scenic Area

References

External links
Official website of Xiling District Government

County-level divisions of Hubei
Geography of Yichang